P-Pop-High School is the fifth album released by Peelander-Z.

Track listing
"P-Pop-High School"  – 0:40
"Let's Go! Karaoke Party!"  – 2:42
"Beautiful Sundae" – 1:07
"Handsome" – 1:43
"Panda-III" – 3:01
"Pillow Pillow" – 2:41
"Learn Japanese" – 1:43
"Duct Tape" – 1:14
"Give Me Your Smile" – 6:07
"Super Health" – 2:31
"Autograph" – 3:11
"Pho!" – 2:34
"P-Zombie-Z" – 2:54
"So Many Mike" – 1:55
"Ninja-High Schooool" – 4:18
"Smile Again" – 0:51

2009 albums
Peelander-Z albums